Night of the Mark VII is a live album by saxophonist Clifford Jordan which was recorded in 1975 and first released on the Muse label.

Reception

In his review on AllMusic, Scott Yanow notes that this is "Overall, Night of the Mark 7 features high-quality hard bop from four of the greats of the idiom, so it is easily recommended to those not already owning the music."

Track listing 
 "John Coltrane" (Bill Lee) – 7:45  
 "Highest Mountain" (Clifford Jordan) – 6:02  
 "Blue Monk" (Thelonious Monk) – 7:20  
 "One for Amos" [listed as Midnight Waltz on all issues] (Sam Jones) – 10:53
 "Midnight Waltz" [listed as One for Amos on all issues] (Cedar Walton) – 10:49

Personnel 
Clifford Jordan – tenor saxophone
Cedar Walton – piano
Sam Jones – bass
Billy Higgins – drums

References 

Clifford Jordan live albums
1975 live albums
Muse Records live albums